Saga Cinema was a theatre located in Copenhagen, Denmark. It opened in 1941 and had a seating capacity of 2,086, which at the time was the third largest cinema in Northern Europe. Due to the decline in cinema the theatre was used as a concert venue from the early-1980s until its closing in 1992. The building was subsequently demolished in 1997.

References

Cinemas in Copenhagen
Concert halls in Denmark
Demolished buildings and structures in Denmark
Buildings and structures demolished in 1997
Former theatres in Copenhagen
Former cinemas